Khazanchi is a 1958 Bollywood film, directed by Prem Narayan Arora, starring Balraj Sahni in the title role and Rajendra Kumar, Shyama are in the other lead roles.

Cast
Balraj Sahni as Radhe Mohan (Khazanchi)
Rajendra Kumar as Harish Mohan
Shyama as Usha
Chitra as Geeta 
Manorama as Usha's Stepmother
Shammi as Roma
Helen as Dancer 			
Minoo Mumtaz as Dancer

Music 
The music is composed by Madan Mohan and lyrics written by Rajinder Krishan, with playback singers Asha Bhosle and Mohammed Rafi.

External links 

1950s Hindi-language films
1958 films